SS George W. Norris was a Liberty ship built in the United States during World War II. She was named after George W. Norris, a member of the U.S. House of Representatives and a United States senator from Nebraska.

Construction
George W. Norris was laid down on 31 October 1944, under a Maritime Commission (MARCOM) contract, MC hull 2388, by J.A. Jones Construction, Brunswick, Georgia; she was sponsored by Miss Gretchen Rath, the eleven-year-old granddaughter of the namesake, and launched on 2 December 1944.

History
She was allocated to Prudential Steamship Corporation, on 12 December 1944. On 6 March 1946, she was wrecked and lost off Tenega Shima, Japan, she was declared a marine total loss.

References

Bibliography

 
 
 
 
 

 

Liberty ships
Ships built in Brunswick, Georgia
1944 ships
Maritime incidents in 1946